Peter Šenk (born 19 May 1994) is a Slovak football defender who currently plays for FC Slovan Rosice on loan from Czech Second League club SK Líšeň.

Club career
Kosorin played his first match for Senica on 26 May 2013 against FC Nitra.

External links
 
 FK Senica profile
 Corgoň Liga profile

References

1994 births
Living people
Slovak footballers
Slovak expatriate footballers
Association football defenders
FK Senica players
FK Pohronie players
SK Líšeň players
MFK Skalica players
OTJ Palárikovo players
FK Fotbal Třinec players
FC Slovan Rosice players
Czech National Football League players
Slovak Super Liga players
2. Liga (Slovakia) players
3. Liga (Slovakia) players
Czech Fourth Division players
Expatriate footballers in the Czech Republic
Slovak expatriate sportspeople in the Czech Republic